Spittal is both a village, a parish and a community in Pembrokeshire, Wales, on the A40 trunk road, approximately halfway between Haverfordwest and Fishguard.

In the 2011 census, the population of the parish was 494.

Name
The village's name is a corruption of the word 'hospital', which is also the root of such names as Spitalfields, London, Spital, Merseyside, Spital-in-the-Street, Lincolnshire, etc.: the village possessed a hospitium (place of accommodation for pilgrims) belonging to the Cathedral of St David's. No trace of this remains.

History
The parish was in the Hundred of Dungleddy, and in the early 19th century had a population of 452, including a number of smaller settlements. There are the remains of several ancient encampments in the parish.

Amenities
In 2004 a new primary school was built in the village to educate approximately 150 pupils from the village and surrounding area. Other amenities include a community hall, a village green and a pub, the Pump on the Green.

The parish church of St Mary is a Grade II listed building of mediaeval origins, but restored in the 19th century. The font is 12th or 13th century.

Scolton Manor
Scolton Manor is a former Victorian country house converted into a museum of Pembrokeshire life. It is a grade II* listed building.

References

External links
Further historical information and sources on GENUKI

Villages in Pembrokeshire
Communities in Pembrokeshire